Pakhtoon Sarfaraz (born 1 January 1998) is an Afghan cricketer. He made his first-class debut for Kunar Province in the 2018–19 Mirwais Nika Provincial 3-Day tournament on 15 February 2019. He made his List A debut for Nangarhar Province in the semi-finals of the 2019 Afghanistan Provincial Challenge Cup tournament on 7 August 2019. He made his Twenty20 debut on 9 September 2020, for Mis Ainak Knights in the 2020 Shpageeza Cricket League.

References

External links
 

1998 births
Living people
Afghan cricketers
Mis Ainak Knights cricketers
Place of birth missing (living people)